2 Corinthians 5 is the fifth chapter of the Second Epistle to the Corinthians in the New Testament of the Christian Bible. It is authored by Paul the Apostle and Timothy (2 Corinthians 1:1) in Macedonia in 55–56 CE.

The 17th-century theologian John Gill summarises the contents of this chapter:

Text 
The original text was written in Koine Greek. This chapter is divided into 21 verses.

Textual witnesses
Some early manuscripts containing the text of this chapter are:
Papyrus 46 (c. AD 200)
Codex Vaticanus (325–350)
Codex Sinaiticus (330–360)
Codex Ephraemi Rescriptus (c. 450)
Codex Freerianus (c. 450; extant verses 8–10,17–18)
Codex Claromontanus (c. 550)

Verse 1 
 For we know that if our earthly house, this tent, is destroyed, we have a building from God, a house not made with hands, eternal in the heavens.
Abarbinel paraphrases  "my dwelling place, which is the body, for that is "the tabernacle of the soul"."

See also
Transfiguration of Jesus
Related Bible parts: Isaiah 53, Romans 3, Romans 4, 2 Corinthians 4, Revelation 6

Notes

References

Sources

External links
 King James Bible - Wikisource
English Translation with Parallel Latin Vulgate
Online Bible at GospelHall.org (ESV, KJV, Darby, American Standard Version, Bible in Basic English)
Multiple bible versions at Bible Gateway (NKJV, NIV, NRSV etc.)

2 Corinthians 5